War Room Stories is the second full-length album by British band Breton. It was released on 3 February 2014 through Believe Records. The album received generally favorable reviews. The song "Got Well Soon" was featured in the 2015 video game Life Is Strange and Dior's commercial for Diorshow mascara.

Track listing

References

2014 albums
Breton (band) albums